The Canton of Villers-Bocage is a former canton situated in the department of the Somme and in the Picardie region of northern France. It was disbanded following the French canton reorganisation which came into effect in March 2015. It had 12,696 inhabitants (2012).

Geography 
The canton is organised around the commune of Villers-Bocage in the arrondissement of Amiens. The altitude varies from 20m (Saint-Vaast-en-Chaussée) to 154m (Talmas)  for an average of 92m.

The canton comprised 24 communes:

Bavelincourt
Beaucourt-sur-l'Hallue
Béhencourt
Bertangles
Cardonnette
Coisy
Contay
Flesselles
Fréchencourt
Mirvaux
Molliens-au-Bois
Montigny-sur-l'Hallue
Montonvillers
Pierregot
Pont-Noyelles
Querrieu
Rainneville
Rubempré
Saint-Gratien
Saint-Vaast-en-Chaussée
Talmas
Vadencourt
Vaux-en-Amiénois
Villers-Bocage

Population

See also
 Arrondissements of the Somme department
 Cantons of the Somme department
 Communes of the Somme department

References

Villers-Bocage (Somme)
2015 disestablishments in France
States and territories disestablished in 2015